La Yeguada is a corregimiento in Calobre District, Veraguas Province, Panama with a population of 1,353 as of 2010. Its population as of 1990 was 1,379; its population as of 2000 was 1,444.

References

Corregimientos of Veraguas Province